Elizabeth Earle "Betsy" Rawls (born May 4, 1928) is an American former LPGA Tour professional golfer. She won eight major championship and 55 LPGA Tour career events. She is a member of the World Golf Hall of Fame.

Early life and education 
Rawls was the daughter of Robert Miller and Mary Earle Rawls. She was born in Spartanburg, South Carolina, and moved to Arlington, Texas, in 1940. She went on to graduate from Lovelady High School and enrolled in North Texas Agricultural College (now UT-Arlington) in 1946 as a physics major. As a freshman, she was recognized by faculty and department heads as a "Who's Who" in Physics, and was selected for the Phi Kappa Theta honor society. The following year Rawls transferred to the University of Texas at Austin, where she graduated with a degree in physics in 1950.

Amateur career 
Rawls started playing golf at age 17. She won the Texas Amateur in 1949 and 1950. She also won the 1949 Trans-National and the 1950 Broadmoor Invitational. In 1950, she finished second at the U.S. Women's Open as an amateur.

Professional career
Rawls turned professional in 1951 and joined the LPGA Tour. She won her first tournament that year at the Sacramento Women's Invitational Open. She would go on to win a total of 55 events on the LPGA Tour, including eight major championships. In 1959, she earned the LPGA Vare Trophy for lowest scoring average. She was the tour's leading money winner in 1952 and 1959 and finished in the top ten on the money list a total of nine times. She led the tour in wins three times, 1952 with eight, 1957 with five (tied with Patty Berg), and 1959 with ten.

Rawls was the LPGA's president from 1961 to 1962. In 1967, when the LPGA Tour Hall of Fame was created, she was one of the six inaugural inductees. The LPGA recognized her induction year into the Hall of Fame of Women's Golf, 1960, as her official induction year into the LPGA Tour Hall of Fame and the World Golf Hall of Fame. Following her retirement from tournament play in 1975, she became a tournament director for the LPGA Tour. From 1987 until 2004, she was the tournament director for the McDonald's LPGA Championship at the DuPont Country Club. In 1996, she was voted the Bob Jones Award, the highest honor given by the United States Golf Association in recognition of distinguished sportsmanship in golf.

Professional wins

LPGA Tour wins (55)
1951 (2) Sacramento Women's Invitational Open, U.S. Women's Open
1952 (8) Houston Weathervane, Bakersfield Open (tied with Marlene Hagge, Betty Jameson and Babe Zaharias), Seattle Weathervane, Cross Country 144 Hole Weathervane, Eastern Open, Women's Western Open, Carrollton Open, Thomasville Open
1953 (4) Barbara Romack Open, Eastern Open, U.S. Women's Open, Fort Worth Open
1954 (3) Tampa Women's Open, St. Louis Open, Texas Open
1955 (1) Carrollton Open
1956 (3) Tampa Open, Sarasota Open, Peach Blossom Open
1957 (5) Tampa Open, Lake Worth Open, Peach Blossom Open, U.S. Women's Open, Reno Open
1958 (2) Tampa Open, St. Petersburg Open
1959 (10) Lake Worth Open, Royal Crown Open, Babe Zaharias Open, Land of the Sky Open, Triangle Round Robin, LPGA Championship, Mt. Prospect Open, Women's Western Open, Waterloo Open, Opie Turner Open
1960 (4) Babe Zaharias Open, Cosmopolitan Open, U.S. Women's Open, Asheville Open
1961 (2) Cosmopolitan Open, Bill Brannin's Swing Parade
1962 (1) J.E. McAuliffe Memorial
1963 (1) Sunshine Women's Open
1964 (2) Dallas Civitan Open Invitational, Valhalla Open
1965 (2) Pensacola Invitational, Waterloo Open
1968 (1) Mickey Wright Invitational
1969 (1) LPGA Championship
1970 (2) Dallas Civitan Open, Cincinnati Open
1972 (1) GAC Classic

LPGA majors are shown in bold.

Other wins (3)
1951 Hollywood Four-Ball (with Betty Dodd)
1954 Inverness Four-Ball (with Betty MacKinnon)
1962 Babe Zaharias Open (tie with Kathy Cornelius)

Major championships

Wins (8)

1 In an 18-hole playoff, Rawls 70, Pung 77.

See also
List of golfers with most LPGA Tour wins
List of golfers with most LPGA major championship wins

References

External links

American female golfers
LPGA Tour golfers
Winners of LPGA major golf championships
World Golf Hall of Fame inductees
Golfers from South Carolina
University of Texas at Arlington alumni
University of Texas at Austin alumni
Sportspeople from Spartanburg, South Carolina
1928 births
Living people
21st-century American women